The Twomey effect describes how additional cloud condensation nuclei (CCN), possibly from anthropogenic pollution, may increase the amount of solar radiation reflected by clouds. This is an indirect effect (or radiative forcing) by such particles, as distinguished from direct effects (forcing) due to enhanced scattering or absorbing radiation by such particles not in clouds.

Cloud droplets normally form on aerosol particles that serve as CCN. Increasing the number concentration of CCN can lead to formation of more cloud droplets, which, in turn, have smaller size. 

The increase in number concentration increases the optical depth of the cloud, which results in increase in the cloud albedo making clouds appear whiter. Satellite imagery often shows trails of cloud or of enhanced brightness of cloud behind ocean-going ships due to this effect. The decrease in global mean absorption of solar radiation due to increases in CCN concentrations exerts a cooling influence on climate; the global average magnitude of this effect over the industrial era is estimated as between −0.3 and −1.8 W/m².

Derivation 

The formula for the optical depth of a cloud:

The formula for the liquid water content of a cloud is:

Where is the density of water.

Taking our assumptions into account we can combine the two to derive this expression:

If we assume liquid water content is equal for the cloud before and after altering the particle density we obtain:

Now we assume total particle density  is increased by a factor of 2 and we can solve for how  changes when  is doubled.

In more general terms, the Twomey effect states that for a fixed liquid water content  and cloud depth, the optical thickness can be represented by:

This brings us to the conclusion that increasing the total particle density also increases the optical depth, illustrating the Twomey Effect mathematically.

See also
 Albrecht effect
 Sulfate
 Aerosols and soot
 Contrail

References

Bibliography

 Hartmann, Dennis L. Global Physical Climatology. Amsterdam: Elsevier, 2016. Print.
 
 
 
 

Cloud and fog physics
Climate forcing
Atmospheric radiation
Air pollution
Particulates